Antonio Meza-Cuadra Bisso (born 12 September 1982) is a former Peruvian footballer who played as a striker.

Club career
In January 2010, it was announced that Antonio signed with Arequipa-based side FBC Melgar for the start of the 2010 Descentralizado season. Meza Cuadra made his debut for FBC Melgar in the Peruvian First Division on February 14, 2010, in a home match against Club Juan Aurich. He played the entire 90 minutes, and the match finished in a 1–1 draw. He scored his first official goal in his second league match for Melgar on February 20, 2010, away to Sporting Cristal. His goal was scored in the 62nd minute, but it was not enough as Sporting Cristal won the match 3–1.

Meza Cuadra played one of his best games of the 2011 season in round 29 at home against Alianza Lima, the league leaders at the time. At the time, his club was only one point above the relegation zone with only one round remaining. During the match, Alianza Lima took the lead twice, but then Meza Cuadra managed to score in the 27th minute and cross the ball that led to Christian Ramos' own goal. Despite Melgar having to play with nine players from the 71st minute, his teammate Edson Aubert managed to score the winner in the 84th minute. The match finished in a 3–2 win over Alianza Lima and guaranteed Melgar's place in the Peruvian First Division that season.

References

External links

1982 births
Living people
Footballers from Lima
Peruvian footballers
Association football forwards
Peruvian Segunda División players
Peruvian Primera División players
Virgen de Chapi FC footballers
Juan Aurich footballers
Club Universitario de Deportes footballers
Unión Huaral footballers
Club Deportivo Universidad César Vallejo footballers
Sport Áncash footballers
Club Deportivo Universidad de San Martín de Porres players
José Gálvez FBC footballers
FBC Melgar footballers
Unión Comercio footballers
Sport Huancayo footballers